This is a list of the National Register of Historic Places listings in McLennan County, Texas.

This is intended to be a complete list of properties and districts listed on the National Register of Historic Places in McLennan County, Texas. Four districts, 18 individual properties, and one former property are listed on the National Register in the county. Two individually listed properties are State Antiquities Landmarks, including one that is also a Recorded Texas Historic Landmark (RTHL) along with seven other individual properties designated as RTHLs. Two districts contain several more RTHLs.

Current listings

The publicly disclosed locations of National Register properties and districts may be seen in a mapping service provided.

|}

Former listing

|}

See also

National Register of Historic Places listings in Texas
Recorded Texas Historic Landmarks in McLennan County

References

External links

Registered Historic Places
McLennan County